Sam Quirke (born 2002) is an Irish hurler who plays for Cork Senior Championship club Midleton. He also joined the Cork senior hurling team in advance of the 2022 season.

Career

Quirke first played hurling competitively as a schoolboy with Midleton CBS Secondary School with whom he won a Harty Cup title in 2019. He later progressed onto the Midleton club team, following in the footsteps of his uncle David Quirke, and won a Premier SHC title in 2021. By this stage Quirke had won consecutive All-Ireland Under-20 Championship titles with the Cork under-20 team in 2020 and 2021. His performances in this grade earned a call-up to the senior team training panel in December 2021.

Career statistics

Honours

Midleton CBS
Harty Cup: 2019

Castlemartyr
Cork Premier Senior Hurling Championship: 2021

Cork
All-Ireland Under-20 Hurling Championship: 2020, 2021
Munster Under-20 Hurling Championship: 2020, 2021

References

2002 births
Living people
Midleton hurlers
Cork inter-county hurlers
People from Midleton